Bruce Myers may refer to:

Bruce Myers (actor) (1942–2020), British actor, comedian and director
Bruce Myers (bishop) (born 1972), Canadian bishop

See also
Bruce Meyers (1926–2021), American designer of the Meyers Manx dune buggy
G. Bruce Meyers (born 1948), American politician in the Montana House of Representatives
Bruce Meyer (born 1957), Canadian poet and educator